Ally Love may refer to:

 Ally Love (footballer) (born 1991), Scottish footballer
 Ally Love (sports host), American fitness instructor